The Tragedy of the Moon is a collection of seventeen nonfiction science essays  by American writer and scientist Isaac Asimov. It was the tenth of a series of books collecting essays from The Magazine of Fantasy and Science Fiction, these being first published between March 1972 and July 1973. It was first published by Doubleday & Company in 1973.

Contents
A — About the Moon
1 — The Tragedy of the Moon
2 — The Triumph of the Moon
3 — Moon Over Babylon
4 — The Week Excuse
B — About Other Small Worlds
5 — The World Ceres
6 — The Clock in the Sky
C — About Carbon
7 — The One and Only
8 — The Unlikely Twins
D — About Micro-organisms
9 — Through The Microglass
10 — Down From The Amoeba
11 — The Cinderella Compound
E — About the Thyroid Gland
12 — Doctor, Doctor, Cut My Throat
F — About Society
13 — Lost in Non-Translation
14 — The Ancient and the Ultimate
15 — By The Numbers
G — And (You Guessed It!) About Me
16 — The Cruise And I (July 1973)
17 — Academe And I

External links
Asimovonline.com

Essay collections by Isaac Asimov
1973 books
Works originally published in The Magazine of Fantasy & Science Fiction
Doubleday (publisher) books